Emrys Jones, FBA, FRGS ( – ) was a Welsh Professor of Geography at the London School of Economics and a renowned author and consultant in the fields of geography and urban planning.

References

Academics of the London School of Economics
Academics of Queen's University Belfast
Alumni of Aberystwyth University
Bards of the Gorsedd
Welsh conscientious objectors
Welsh urban planners
Fellows of the British Academy
Fellows of the Royal Geographical Society
People from Aberdare
Welsh geographers
Welsh pacifists
Victoria Medal recipients
1920 births
2006 deaths